A Dubliner (pronounced with stress on the first syllable) is a person who comes from Dublin in Ireland.

Dubliner could also refer to one of the following:

Dubliners, a collection of short stories by James Joyce
The Dubliners, an Irish folk band
The Dubliner (magazine), a contemporary commentary on Dublin
Dubliner cheese, a hard cheese produced in Ireland

See also
Dubliner Challenge, a Swedish golf tournament